"Strange Phenomena" is a song written and recorded by English musician Kate Bush. It was released as a single only in Brazil in June 1979, and was the fifth and final single from her debut album, The Kick Inside.

"Strange Phenomena" speaks about déjà vu, synchronicity and how coincidences sometimes cluster together in seemingly meaningful ways. It has been described as "a frank paean to menstruation" by The Guardian.

This, and a number of other early Brazilian singles, were pressed at 33.3 rpm. Brazil is one of few countries that released singles at this speed, along with Argentina.

Personnel
Kate Bush – piano, lead vocals
Andrew Powell – Fender Rhodes
Duncan Makcay – synthesizer
Ian Bairnson – electric guitar, acoustic guitar
David Paton – bass guitar
Stuart Elliott – drummer
Morris Pert – percussion

References

1979 singles
Kate Bush songs
Songs written by Kate Bush
1978 songs
EMI Records singles
Song recordings produced by Andrew Powell